Beaver County is a county in the Commonwealth of Pennsylvania. As of the 2020 census, the population was 168,215. Its county seat is Beaver, and its largest city is Aliquippa. The county was created on March 12, 1800, from parts of Allegheny and Washington counties. It took its name from the Beaver River.

Beaver County is part of the Pittsburgh, PA Metropolitan Statistical Area.

History

The original townships at the date of the erection of Beaver County (1800) were North Beaver, east and west of the Big Beaver Creek; South Beaver, west of the Big Beaver; and Sewickley, east of the Big Beaver—all north of the Ohio River; and Hanover, First Moon, and Second Moon, south of the Ohio.

Geography
It has a humid continental climate (Dfa/Dfb) and average monthly temperatures in the Beaver/Rochester vicinity range from 29.4 °F in January to 73.2 °F in July.

Bodies of water
 The Ohio River flows north through Beaver County from a point near Ambridge, then turns west near Beaver and on to the Ohio and West Virginia borders.  It divides the southern third of the county from the northern two-thirds.
 The Beaver River flows south from Lawrence County entering Beaver County near Koppel and continuing south to its confluence with the Ohio near Beaver.

Adjacent counties
Lawrence County (north)
Butler County (east)
Allegheny County (southeast)
Washington County (south)
Hancock County, West Virginia (west)
Columbiana County, Ohio (west)

Protected areas
Ohio River Islands National Wildlife Refuge (part)
Raccoon Creek State Park, a Pennsylvania state park
Bradys Run Park
Brush Creek Park
Old Economy Park

Demographics

As of the census of 2000, there were 181,412 people, 72,576 households, and 50,512 families residing in the county.  The population density was 418 people per square mile (161/km2).  There were 77,765 housing units at an average density of 179 per square mile (69/km2).  The racial makeup of the county was 92.55% White, 5.96% Black or African American, 0.10% Native American, 0.25% Asian, 0.01% Pacific Islander, 0.20% from other races, and 0.92% from two or more races.  0.72% of the population were Hispanic or Latino of any race. 23.0% were of German, 17.4% Italian, 9.9% Irish, 6.5% English, 6.4% Polish and 5.8% American ancestry.

There were 72,576 households, out of which 28.60% had children under the age of 18 living with them, 54.50% were married couples living together, 11.40% had a female householder with no husband present, and 30.40% were non-families. Of all households 26.90% were made up of individuals, and 13.10% had someone living alone who was 65 years of age or older.  The average household size was 2.44 and the average family size was 2.96.

In the county, the age distribution of the population shows 22.60% under the age of 18, 7.40% from 18 to 24, 27.30% from 25 to 44, 24.20% from 45 to 64, and 18.40% who were 65 years of age or older.  The median age was 41 years. For every 100 females, there were 91.90 males.  For every 100 females age 18 and over, there were 88.20 males.

2020 Census

Government and politics

|}

Voter registration
In November 2008, there were 118,269 registered voters in Beaver County.

 Democratic: 70,819 (59.88%)
 Republican: 36,239 (30.64%)
 Other parties/non-partisan: 11,211 (9.48%)

By April 2016, there were 109,091 registered voters, a decrease of 7.7% since 2008.

The county is divided into 129 precincts.

 Democratic: 58,828 (53.93%)
 Republican: 38,015 (34.85%)
 Other parties/non-partisan: 12,248 (11.23%)

As of November 2, 2021, there were 112,744 registered voters in the county. Democrats held a plurality of voters. There were 51,226 registered Democrats, 46,418 registered Republicans, 14,404 voters registered to other parties, 610 to the Libertarian Party and 86 voters registered to the Green Party.

Political history
Beaver County used to be a Democratic stronghold, and still has a large Democratic edge in registration. In 2015, however, the GOP took majority status in the Commissioners' Office for the first time since 1955. Multiple Democratic seats in both houses of the Pennsylvania Legislature have been lost to Republicans over the past few years. In statewide and federal elections it has been moving rightward as well. In 2004 Democrat John Kerry won Beaver County over Republican George Bush 51% to 48%. In 2008 Republican John McCain defeated Democrat Barack Obama 50% to 47%, becoming the first Republican to win there since 1972 and only the third since 1928. Mitt Romney and Donald Trump (twice) carried the county in the next three elections, cementing its status as a "red county" in presidential politics. In 2010 Republican Governor Tom Corbett and Republican Senator Pat Toomey both carried Beaver in their successful statewide bids and Toomey won the county again in 2016. However, Democrats have still seen recent success in Beaver County in non-presidential races, with Democrats often being competitive in the county in senatorial and gubernatorial elections. Beaver County voted for Bob Casey Jr. in his reelection bid in 2012 50% to 47% and again voted to re-elect Casey in 2018, as well as Democrat Tom Wolf. 

In the most recent election cycle, Democratic gubernatorial candidate Josh Shapiro defeated Republican Doug Mastriano in Beaver County. However, Shapiro was the only Democrat in this cycle to carry Beaver County.

County commissioners

County officials

State representatives

State senators

United States House of Representatives

United States Senate

Attractions
Beaver County offers many shops and places to eat. It is home to the Beaver Valley Mall in Center Township, which has shops and restaurants.

Near Koppel there is Buttermilk Falls, a naturally occurring waterfall. In Brighton Township there is Brady's Run Park. Racoon Creek State Park is one of Pennsylvania’s largest and most visited state parks. The park encompasses  and features the  Raccoon Lake. Additionally, there are many riverfront parks throughout the county. The North County Trail is an 11-mile point-to-point trail near Darlington to the Ohio state line.

Transportation

Major roads and highways

Airports
Beaver County Airport
Zelienople Municipal Airport

Public transit
Public transit is provided by the Beaver County Transit Authority.

Education

Colleges and universities
Geneva College
Penn State Beaver Campus
Trinity Episcopal School for Ministry
Community College of Beaver County

Community, junior, and technical colleges
Community College of Beaver County

Public school districts

Aliquippa School District
Ambridge Area School District
Beaver Area School District
Big Beaver Falls Area School District
Blackhawk School District (part)
Central Valley School District
Freedom Area School District
Hopewell Area School District
Midland Borough School District
New Brighton Area School District
Riverside Beaver County School District
Rochester Area School District
South Side Area School District
Western Beaver County School District

High schools

Aliquippa High School
Ambridge Area High School
Beaver Area High School
Beaver County Christian High School
Beaver Falls High School
Big Beaver Area High School
Blackhawk High School
Central Valley High School
Freedom Area High School
Hopewell High School
Lincoln Park Performing Arts Charter School
New Brighton High School
Quigley Catholic High School
Riverside High School
Rochester Area High School
South Side Beaver High School
Western Beaver High School

Charter schools
As reported by the Pennsylvania Department of Education – EdNA, as of April 2010.

Baden Academy Charter School (grades K–6)
Lincoln Park Performing Arts Charter School (grades 7–12)

Private schools
As reported by the Pennsylvania Department of Education – EdNA, as of April 2010.
Agapeland Children Garden – Beaver
Beaver County Christian School -Upper – Beaver Falls
Beaver Co Christian -West Park Elementary – Beaver Falls
Bethel Christian School – Aliquippa
Deliverance Temple Ministries ROOTS Inc Christian Academy – Aliquippa
Hope Christian Academy – Aliquippa
North Hills Christian School – Baden
Our Lady of Fatima School – Aliquippa
Pleasant Hill Wesleyan Academy – Hookstown
Quigley Catholic High School – Baden
St John the Baptist School – Monaca
St Monica Catholic Academy – Beaver Falls
Sts Peter & Paul School – Beaver
Sylvania Hills Christian – Rochester

Former school districts
In 2009, Center Area School District and Monaca School District merged to form Central Valley School District.

Communities

Under Pennsylvania law, there are four types of incorporated municipalities: cities, boroughs, townships, and, in at most two cases, towns. The following cities, boroughs and townships are in Beaver County:

Cities
Aliquippa
Beaver Falls

Boroughs

Ambridge
Baden
Beaver (county seat)
Big Beaver
Bridgewater
Conway
Darlington
East Rochester
Eastvale
Economy
Ellwood City (mostly in Lawrence County)
Fallston
Frankfort Springs
Freedom
Georgetown
Glasgow
Homewood
Hookstown
Industry
Koppel
Midland
Monaca
New Brighton
New Galilee
Ohioville
Patterson Heights
Rochester
Shippingport
South Heights
West Mayfield

Townships

Brighton
Center
Chippewa
Darlington
Daugherty
First Moon (extinct)
Franklin
Greene
Hanover
Harmony
Hopewell
Independence
Marion
Moon (extinct)
New Sewickley
North Sewickley
Patterson
Potter
Pulaski
Raccoon
Rochester
Second Moon (extinct)
Sewickley (extinct)
South Beaver
Vanport
White

Census-designated places
Harmony Township
Patterson Township

Unincorporated communities
Byersdale
Cannelton
Fombell
Frisco
Gringo
Harshaville
Kobuta

Former community
Borough Township – established in 1804 from the small southeast corner of South Beaver Township.  In 1970, it was renamed Vanport Township.

Population ranking
The population ranking of the following table is based on the 2010 census of Beaver County.

† county seat

Notable people

Sam Adams – early explorer of the American west
Gust Avrakotos – CIA operative active in Operation Cyclone
Julian Michael Carver – science fiction novelist known for his usage of dinosaurs in fiction
Jim Covert – former NFL offensive tackle for the Chicago Bears, inducted into the College Football Hall of Fame in 2003
Ed DeChellis – head men's basketball coach for The Naval Academy
Mike Ditka – former NFL tight end for the Chicago Bears, Philadelphia Eagles and Dallas Cowboys, and head coach for the Chicago Bears and New Orleans Saints, inducted into the Pro Football Hall of Fame in 1988 (as a tight end)
Tony Dorsett – former NFL running back for the Dallas Cowboys and Denver Broncos, inducted into both the Pro and College Football Hall of Fame in 1994
Shane Douglas – born Troy Martin, professional wrestler, best known with Extreme Championship Wrestling, having also wrestled for World Championship Wrestling, Total Nonstop Action Wrestling, and (briefly) with the World Wrestling Federation. He is also a former teacher for Beaver Area High School
Terry Francona – former Major League Baseball first baseman and outfielder for the Montreal Expos, Chicago Cubs, Cincinnati Reds, Cleveland Indians and Milwaukee Brewers, and former manager for the Philadelphia Phillies and Boston Red Sox
Sean Gilbert – former NFL defensive lineman for the Los Angeles/St. Louis Rams, Washington Redskins, Carolina Panthers and Oakland Raiders
Donnie Iris – musician, former member of The Jaggerz and Wild Cherry, also notable for his solo performances
Ty Law – former NFL cornerback for the New England Patriots, New York Jets, Kansas City Chiefs and Denver Broncos
Joe Letteri – three-time Academy Award-winning visual imaging artist, and visual effects supervisor of the movie Avatar
Henry Mancini – music composer, including "Moon River" and "The Pink Panther Theme", among many others
"Pistol" Pete Maravich – former NBA guard for the Atlanta Hawks, New Orleans/Utah Jazz and Boston Celtics, inducted into the Basketball Hall of Fame in 1987
Press Maravich – former NCAA Basketball coach
Nate Martin - Entrepreneur and "Founding Father of Escape Rooms"
Doc Medich – former Major League Baseball pitcher for the New York Yankees, Pittsburgh Pirates, Oakland Athletics, Seattle Mariners, New York Mets, Texas Rangers and Milwaukee Brewers
Ryan "Archie" Miller - former NCAA Basketball coach for the Dayton Flyers and Indiana Hoosiers
Sean Miller - former NCAA Basketball coach for the Arizona Wildcats
Joe Namath – former NFL and AFL quarterback for the New York Jets and Los Angeles Rams, inducted into the Pro Football Hall of Fame in 1985
Babe Parilli – former NFL and AFL quarterback for the Green Bay Packers, Cleveland Browns, Oakland Raiders, Boston Patriots and New York Jets, former CFL quarterback for the Ottawa Rough Riders, and All-American quarterback for the University of Kentucky
Paul Posluszny – NFL linebacker for the Jacksonville Jaguars
Dan Radakovich – Athletics Director for the Georgia Tech Yellow Jackets
Darrelle Revis – NFL cornerback for the New York Jets
Jesse Steinfeld – former Surgeon General of the United States
Pete Suder – former Major League Baseball infielder for the Philadelphia Athletics/Kansas City Athletics
Mark Vlasic – former NFL quarterback for the San Diego Chargers, Kansas City Chiefs and Tampa Bay Buccaneers
William Ziegler – industrialist and co-founder of the Royal Baking Powder Company

See also
 National Register of Historic Places listings in Beaver County, Pennsylvania
 Ohio River Trail

References

External links

Beaver County website
Beaver County history

 
1800 establishments in Pennsylvania
Counties of Appalachia
Pennsylvania counties on the Ohio River
Pittsburgh metropolitan area
Populated places established in 1800
Ukrainian communities in the United States